Gemsstock is a mountain of the Swiss Lepontine Alps, overlooking Andermatt in the canton of Uri.  A glacier named Gurschenfirn lies over its northern flanks. The Gemsstock is a subpeak of the higher Chastelhorn, lying approximately one kilometre south-west.

Ski Area 

Gemsstock is part of the Gotthard Oberalp Arena, as is Naetschen, which sits on the other side of Andermatt.

There are two 'skiing sections' on Gemsstock. There is a cable car in Andermatt which goes directly up to the middle of the mountain. On the middle level, known as Gurschenalp, there are:
 3x ski lifts
 1x 2-man chairlift
 2x T-bars
 1x 'fun park' (no half pipes)
 3x ski runs
 2x blue (beginner) runs
 1x red (intermediate) run

Up on the top of Gemsstock there is:
 a completely off-piste and untracked run that runs around the back of Gemsstock, called The Guspis.
 a black run called The B.Russi Run (named after Andermatt's Bernhard Russi).
 a red run called Sun Track.

Gemsstock is a north peak, so you can ski on it until May. Before February it's very cold on Gemsstock because the sun can't shine on the peak.

Future

In the future, Orascom Hotels and Development plan to build 5 new ski lifts, along with several new runs, as part of their Andermatt expansion project.

These plans did include a cable car from Hospental. However, the Swiss Alpine Club stated that they did not "see the need" for a cable car running from Hospental, as there is already one running from Andermatt. It was later shown that this lift was not going to be constructed.

  Another idea was a cable car or gondola from Nätschen or Gütsch to Gurschenalp (similar to the Peak 2 Peak Gondola in Canada). This cable car would travel over the valley, and over Andermatt. This, however, was not included in the project's official ski area master plan. This idea would have been very costly to construct, maintain, and run, and may have been unpopular with the residents of Andermatt, due to the fact that it would block the view of the sky above.

Ski Lifts 

Gemsstock has 5 ski lifts, all made by Garaventa.

See also
List of mountains of Switzerland accessible by public transport

References

External links
Gemsstock – Aerial cable car to the Gotthard region Myswitzerland.com
Gemsstock on Hikr

Mountains of the Alps
Mountains of Switzerland
Ski areas and resorts in Switzerland
Andermatt
Tourist attractions in the canton of Uri
Mountains of the canton of Uri
Lepontine Alps